Baishamen Lighthouse, located on Haidian Island, Haikou, in the province of Hainan, China, is the sixth tallest lighthouse in the world, and the second tallest in China. The triangular, cylindrical tower and base are made entirely of white concrete.

It serves as a landfall light for the city of Haikou, and is located on the east side of the entrance to Haikou Bay, the harbor of Haikou on the northeast shore of Haidian Island.

See also

 List of lighthouses in China
 List of tallest lighthouses in the world
 Mulantou Lighthouse – the tallest lighthouse in China

References

  Listed as Baisha Men.

External links

Information of Baishamen Lighthouse

Lighthouses completed in 2000
Lighthouses in China
Buildings and structures in Haikou
Haidian Island
2000 establishments in China